Lloyd Guss (born 22 January 1959) is a Canadian hurdler. He competed in the men's 400 metres hurdles at the 1984 Summer Olympics. He also competed in the two-man and four-man bobsleigh at the 1988 Winter Olympics.

See also
 List of athletes who competed in both the Summer and Winter Olympic games

References

1959 births
Living people
Athletes (track and field) at the 1984 Summer Olympics
Bobsledders at the 1988 Winter Olympics
Canadian male hurdlers
Canadian male bobsledders
Olympic track and field athletes of Canada
Olympic bobsledders of Canada
Athletes (track and field) at the 1982 Commonwealth Games
Athletes (track and field) at the 1986 Commonwealth Games
Commonwealth Games competitors for Canada
Athletes (track and field) at the 1983 Pan American Games
Pan American Games track and field athletes for Canada
Place of birth missing (living people)